Peter Sutcliffe (1946–2020) was a prolific English serial killer.

Peter Sutcliffe may also refer to:
Peter Sutcliffe (racing driver) (born 1936), British textile manufacturer and race driver
Peter Sutcliffe (footballer) (born 1957), English footballer 
Pete Sutcliffe, guitarist for Boss in 1979

Fictional characters
Pete Sutcliffe, a character in Gavin & Stacey